Darlington Murasiranwa (born February 7, 2001) is a Zimbabwean footballer who plays for FC London in League1 Ontario.

Early life
Murasiranwa was born in Zimbabwe, later moving to South Africa where he began playing football in Cape Town with Barca Juniors at age 9. When he was 13, he moved to Edmonton, Canada, re-uniting with his parents, who had moved to North America, when Darlington was an infant in search of a better life for  the family due to the economic hardships in their homeland, leaving him with his grandparents. In Edmonton, he joined the FC Edmonton academy. He joined the Vancouver Whitecaps Academy at U16 level, before returning to the FC Edmonton academy.

University career
In 2019, he began attending the University of Guelph, playing for the men's soccer team. He kept clean sheets in his first two starts. Ahead of the 2021 season, he announced he was transferring to MacEwan University where he would play for the MacEwan Griffins. However, he ultimately turned pro instead a couple of months later.

Club career
Murasiranwa signed with Canadian Premier League side FC Edmonton on February 5, 2021. He made his debut for Edmonton on August 15 in a Canadian Championship match against Cavalry FC. He made six appearances in his first season, keeping a clean sheet in the 1-0 victory in the final game of the season against Forge FC. In February 2022, Edmonton announced that Murasiranwa would be returning to the team for the 2022 season. Following the 2022 season, Murasiranza trained with English non-league side Shepshed Dynamo.

In March 2023, he joined FC London in League1 Ontario.

International career
Murasiranwa has participated in camps at the U15 and U17 level for Canada.

Career statistics

References

External links
U Sports Statistics

2001 births
Living people
21st-century Zimbabwean people
Zimbabwean emigrants to Canada
Zimbabwean emigrants to South Africa
Canadian soccer players
Zimbabwean footballers
Association football goalkeepers
FC Edmonton players
University and college soccer players in Canada
Vancouver Whitecaps Residency players
Canadian Premier League players
Guelph Gryphons men's soccer players